Massachusetts House of Representatives' 17th Middlesex district in the United States is one of 160 legislative districts included in the lower house of the Massachusetts General Court. It covers part of Middlesex County. Democrat Vanna Howard was elected to the position on November 3, 2020.

District profile
As of the last redistricting in 2011, the district encompasses the southeastern portion of the city of Lowell and the northeastern portion of the town of Chelmsford. It has maintained these boundaries since the 2001 redistricting.

 Chelmsford's Precinct 4
 Lowell's Ward 1; Precinct 3 of Ward 2; Precincts 2 and 3 of Ward 4; Ward 10; and Ward 11

The current district geographic boundary overlaps with those of the Massachusetts Senate's 1st Middlesex and 3rd Middlesex districts.

Former locations
 c. 1872: Marlborough

List of members representing the district
 Daniel Wetherbee, circa 1858 
 Shattuck Hartwell, circa 1859 
 Winfield S. Slocum, circa 1888 
 Arthur C. Walworth, circa 1888 
 Maurice Allan Buck, circa 1920 
 Thomas M. Flaherty, circa 1951

See also
 List of Massachusetts House of Representatives elections
 List of Massachusetts General Courts
 List of former districts of the Massachusetts House of Representatives
 Other Middlesex County districts of the Massachusetts House of Representatives: 1st, 2nd, 3rd, 4th, 5th, 6th, 7th, 8th, 9th, 10th, 11th, 12th, 13th, 14th, 15th, 16th, 18th, 19th, 20th, 21st, 22nd, 23rd, 24th, 25th, 26th, 27th, 28th, 29th, 30th, 31st, 32nd, 33rd, 34th, 35th, 36th, 37th

Images
Portraits of legislators

References

Further reading

External links
 Ballotpedia
  (State House district information based on U.S. Census Bureau's American Community Survey).
 League of Women Voters of Greater Lowell
 League of Women Voters of Chelmsford

House
Government of Middlesex County, Massachusetts